The 48th New Brunswick Legislative Assembly was created following a general election in 1974. It was dissolved on September 15, 1978.

Leadership

The speaker was William J. Woodroffe.

Premier Richard Hatfield led the government. The Progressive Conservative Party was the ruling party.

History

Members 

Notes:

See also
1974 New Brunswick general election
Legislative Assembly of New Brunswick

References 
 Canadian Parliamentary Guide, 1978, PG Normandin

Terms of the New Brunswick Legislature
1974 establishments in New Brunswick
1978 disestablishments in New Brunswick
20th century in New Brunswick